Giraltovce is a town in the Prešov Region of eastern Slovakia.

History
The town was first mentioned in 1383 as Giralth. It was named after a man called Geralth who was first hereditary scultetus (a locator serving a noble in founding a new village). The town was founded in the 13th century. In 1427 it was the property of the Széchy family, a few years later it belonged to the Somosy family. The scultetus had a leading role in the village. They acted as the representative of the village before the landlords, regional and religious authorities. They controlled villagers to pay their taxes. Moreover, they had also right of minor magistracy. Their rights were more restricted by changes in the 16th century. In the 17th century, the institution of hereditary scultetus in the village expired. Since that moment, local villagers voted their Chief Magistrate ("Richter").

The most privileged part of inhabitants of the village was nobility, who built at least two mansions there. Moreover, János Semsey conducted to build in the village the temple of the Lutheran church (1650 - 1654), which was the first temple built in the village.

Notable citizens
 Joseph Goldberger

Twin towns – sister cities

Giraltovce is twinned with:
 Ustrzyki Dolne, Poland

See also
 List of municipalities and towns in Slovakia

References

Genealogical resources

The records for genealogical research are available at the state archive "Statny Archiv in Presov, Slovakia"

 Roman Catholic church records (births/marriages/deaths): 1840-1902 (parish B)
 Greek Catholic church records (births/marriages/deaths): 1862-1933 (parish B)
 Lutheran church records (births/marriages/deaths): 1828-1898 (parish A)

External links
 
 
Surnames of living people in Giraltovce

Cities and towns in Slovakia
Šariš